Medical journals are published regularly to communicate new research to clinicians, medical scientists, and other healthcare workers. This article lists academic journals that focus on the practice of medicine or any medical specialty. Journals are listed alphabetically by journal name, and also grouped by the subfield of medicine they focus on.

Journals for other fields of healthcare can be found at List of healthcare journals.

Journals by name

Journals by specialty

Allergy
 Allergy
 Journal of Asthma
 Journal of Asthma & Allergy Educators

Anesthesiology
 Acta Anaesthesiologica Scandinavica
 Anaesthesia
 Anesthesia & Analgesia
 Annals of Cardiac Anaesthesia
 British Journal of Anaesthesia
 The Clinical Journal of Pain
 Current Opinion in Anesthesiology
 European Journal of Anaesthesiology
 Korean Journal of Anesthesiology
 Pain
 Le Praticien en Anesthésie Réanimation
 Seminars in Cardiothoracic and Vascular Anesthesia

Cleft palate and craniofacial anomalies
 The Cleft Palate-Craniofacial Journal

Dentistry
 List of dental journals

Pharmaceutical sciences

 Advanced Drug Delivery Reviews
 Health Economics
 International Journal of Medical Sciences
 International Journal of Pharmaceutics
 Journal of Controlled Release

Pharmacology
 Alimentary Pharmacology & Therapeutics
 The Annals of Pharmacotherapy
 Clinical Pharmacology: Advances and Applications
 Clinical Pharmacology & Therapeutics
 Expert Opinion on Drug Delivery
 Expert Opinion on Drug Discovery
 Expert Opinion on Drug Metabolism & Toxicology
 Expert Opinion on Drug Safety
 Expert Opinion on Emerging Drugs
 Expert Opinion on Investigational Drugs
 Expert Opinion on Pharmacotherapy
 Indian Journal of Pharmacology
 The Medical Letter on Drugs and Therapeutics
 Scientia Pharmaceutica

Plastic Surgery
 Annals of Plastic Surgery
 Plastic and Reconstructive Surgery

Psychiatry

 American Journal of Psychiatry
 Archives of General Psychiatry
 Biological Psychiatry
 British Journal of Psychiatry
 Journal of Clinical Psychiatry
 Journal of Psychopharmacology
 Molecular Psychiatry
 Neuropsychopharmacology
 Schizophrenia Bulletin
 Schizophrenia Research

Sports Medicine
 American Journal of Sports Medicine
 British Journal of Sports Medicine
 Clinical Journal of Sport Medicine
 European Review of Aging and Physical Activity
 Exercise and Sport Sciences Reviews
 The Journal of Strength and Conditioning Research
 Medicine & Science in Sports & Exercise
 The Physician and Sportsmedicine
 Research in Sports Medicine
 Sports Health

Toxicology
 Journal of Applied Toxicology
 Toxicology
 Toxicology and Industrial Health
 Toxicologic Pathology
 Regulatory Toxicology and Pharmacology

Defunct medical journals
 Human Resources Development Journal
 Medical Press and Circular
 Medical World
 The Zoist

See also
 List of health care journals
 List of scientific journals
 List of International Committee of Medical Journal Editors (ICMJE) member journals

External links
Free Medical Journals
Catalog of National Library of Medicine

 List of medical journals
Medical journals
Medical j